Craig Alan Newby (born 27 July 1979) is a former New Zealand rugby union player.

Newby spent the bulk of his career in New Zealand, playing for Otago, the  Highlanders, North Harbour and the Blues. He had a short stint with Newcastle Falcons in 2002. He made three appearances for New Zealand before moving to England in 2008 to play for Leicester Tigers. At the end of his first season at Leicester he helped them defeat London Irish to win the Premiership final. The following year Leicester retained the Premiership.

Coaching career 2012 - present
Ulster Rugby Skills coach - 2021–present
England U20 woman's forwards coach 2019 - 2021
Wimbledon National 3 Forwards and Defence coach 2018 - Current
Harlequins DPP U16s coach 2018 - Current
Wasps U18 Forwards and Defence coach 2016-17
Coventry National 1 Defence coach 2016-17
NEC Japan Top League Forwards and defence coach 2015-16
Cambridge National 2 Head coach (Defence and Forwards) 2012-15

Playing career 1999 - 2012 
Leicester Tigers UK 2008-12 (Captain 2011)
Highlanders 2002-08 (Captain 2007/08)
Otago rugby 2005-08 (Captain 05–08)
New Zealand All Black 2004/06
New Zealand All Black 7's 1999-2002 - World Cup winner 2001, Manchester Commonwealth Games Gold medallist 2002

School career
Director of Rugby, St Johns Leatherhead.                                          
Assistant Housemaster North House, St John's Leatherhead
Assistant Director of Rugby July 2016 - July 2017 Warwick School, First XV Backs coach. Winners of the National School Title

References

External links
 
 
 Tigers sign Highlanders flanker
 Leicester Tigers profile

1979 births
New Zealand international rugby union players
Living people
New Zealand rugby union coaches
New Zealand rugby union players
Leicester Tigers players
Newcastle Falcons players
Barbarian F.C. players
Highlanders (rugby union) players
Blues (Super Rugby) players
Otago rugby union players
North Harbour rugby union players
Commonwealth Games gold medallists for New Zealand
Rugby sevens players at the 2002 Commonwealth Games
New Zealand male rugby sevens players
Commonwealth Games rugby sevens players of New Zealand
New Zealand expatriate rugby union players
New Zealand expatriate sportspeople in England
Expatriate rugby union players in England
Rugby union players from Rotorua
People educated at Rotorua Boys' High School
New Zealand international rugby sevens players
Commonwealth Games medallists in rugby sevens
Ulster Rugby non-playing staff
Medallists at the 2002 Commonwealth Games
New Zealand expatriate sportspeople in Northern Ireland